The Holland-class ocean-going patrol vessels are a class of four ocean-going patrol vessels constructed for the Royal Netherlands Navy. They are designed to fulfill patrol and intervention tasks against lightly armed opponents, such as pirates and smugglers, but have much higher level electronic and radar surveillance capabilities which are used for military stabilization and security roles, short of outright war. Without sonar or long range weapons, they utilize the surveillance capabilities of the Thales integrated mast, which integrates communication systems and two 4-faced phased arrays for air and surface search.

History
A contract between the Royal Netherlands Navy and Damen Schelde Naval Shipbuilding in Vlissingen, the Netherlands was signed in 2007 for the construction of four vessels at a total cost of €467.8 million.

The vessels resulted from the Dutch Ministry of Defence's Marinestudie. The study proposes the sale of four existing s, and using the proceeds and savings of the sale to commission four dedicated patrol vessels, allow the building of a more capable Joint Support Ship to replace the auxiliary replenishment ship , and reintroducing a mine-sweeping capability to the Dutch Navy.

The vessels are designed for global use, in particular to be deployed to the Caribbean region, the South China Sea and the North Sea.  When deployed to the Caribbean, they operate in conjunction with the Dutch Caribbean Coast Guard. The ships have the capability to carry out missions such as anti-piracy and blockade duties, and also can be used for emergency transport. They are constructed with heavier mild steel and armour, which results in a more robust ship of greater weight, than the previous M class frigates.

Armament

Due to their size and sensor suite, the OPVs can be compared to corvettes and frigates. However, their relatively light armament does not fit with that qualification.

The cannon is adequate for deployment against smuggling vessels (such as interception of drug transports with fast speed boats in the Caribbean). Secondary armament is provided by a  Oto Melara Marlin WS autocannon, two  Oto Melara Hitrole NT's and two 12.7 mm M2HB machine guns. All can be remotely operated. Two water cannon are used for non-lethal protection and fire fighting. In addition, there are six stations for hand-operated FN MAG-7.62mm machine guns.

For the interception of fast speedboats (which after all are faster than the OPV), two FRISC's (Fast Raiding Interception Special forces Craft) are transported, capable of reaching speeds greater than 40 knots. One of them is carried in davits, the other in a small dock (a slipway) on the stern (below the helideck). The ships also received a Combat Management System (CMS) from CAMS-Force Vision.

Sensor suite
It has link 11 & 16 data links  a mine detection sonar and an infra-red Gatekeeper/electro-optical (EO) warning system.

The sensor systems are housed in an integrated mast, also provided by Thales, called the I-Mast 400.  Thales also built the satellite communications system for the ships.

Propulsion
The Holland class is fitted with a combined electric or diesel (CODELOD) propulsion system. The electric motor is used mainly for low-speed operations.

Specifications

The ship's complement is 52, as well as up to 39 people for duties such as helicopter or medical crew.

Other characteristics
The ships are built to a design that is intended to reduce the ability of radar to detect them, as well improving seakeeping by locating the superstructure unusually far aft. The ships are painted a new light blue-gray color, which supposedly has a better camouflage-effect than the standard light-grey paint used by other RNLN ships.

Beside these special forces crafts, the Holland class has an improved internal communication infrastructure and is more resistant to the use of resources that are characteristic for asymmetric warfare.

Ships in class
On 20 December 2007 the contract was signed with Dutch-based Damen Schelde Naval Shipbuilding for four ships at a cost of around €467.8 million.

While the first two vessels were built at the Vlissingen shipyard in the Netherlands, to save cost and speed up completion the remainder of the class were assembled at Damen Schelde's shipyard in Galati in Romania. The Thales I-mast is a separate, air-tight module which was built separately from the rest of the ships and then bolted on once complete. The Friesland was actually commissioned before her mast was installed.

The ships were named after Dutch provinces of historical maritime importance.

Holland (P840)
Holland was laid down on 8 December 2008, launched on 2 February 2010 and commissioned on 12 May 2011.  She was built at the Damen Schelde shipyard in Vlissingen. On 16 November 2011 she was the first ship in her class to receive the Thales Integrated Mast IM-400. The ship entered service during the 2012 Dutch navy days in Den Helder.

Zeeland (P841)
Zeeland was laid down on 5 October 2009 and launched on 20 November 2010. She began sea trials on 31 August 2011. She was built at the Damen Schelde shipyard in Vlissingen.  Zeeland was delivered on 20 October 2011, and received her Thales Integrated Mast IM-400 in December 2012. To enter service after final fitting out and finishing trials. Zeeland was commissioned on 23 August 2013 at Vlissingen.

Friesland (P842)
Friesland was laid down on 26 November 2009 and launched on 4 November 2010. She began sea trials on 27 September 2011, and she was delivered to the Defense Material Organisation (DMO) on 11 April 2012. She was built at the Damen Schelde shipyard in Galați. On 26 April 2012, she assisted in the rescue of a sail training vessel off Iona while participating in an international exercise. In January 2013 Friesland became the first of the Holland-class to deploy to the Dutch Caribbean as West Indies Guard Ship.

Groningen (P843)

Groningen was laid down on 9 April 2010 and launched on 21 April 2011.  She was built at the Damen Schelde shipyard in Galați.

References

External links

 Holland class at Damen Schelde
 Royal Netherlands Navy

Holland-class offshore patrol vessels
Patrol ship classes